Lloyd Williams and Underwood was a firm of architects based in Denbigh and active mostly in North Wales in the second half of the 19th century. The partners were Richard Lloyd Williams, formerly a pupil of Thomas Fulljames, and Martin Underwood, who was also county surveyor for Denbighshire. Several of their designed now have listed status.

Works 
The firm's designs include:

Station house at Foryd railway station (1858)
Remodelling of Galltfaenan Hall (1860s), now Grade II listed
Denbigh railway station (1860, now demolished); some other stations for the same Vale of Clwyd Railway
Bettws yn Rhos National School (1861)
Llanfair Dyffryn Clwyd National School (1861)
Chapel at North Wales Hospital (1862), now Grade II listed
Restoration at Church of St James, Nantglyn (1862), Grade II listed
Chancel at Pontblyddyn Church, Flintshire (1866)
Llangollen Town Hall (1867), Grade II listed
Llangollen Police Station (1867), now Grade II listed
The Church House (Old Grammar School), Ruthin (1867), now Grade II* listed
Rebuilding of the Church of St Winifred, LLangernyw (1869)
St Mary's Church, Denbigh (1874), now Grade II* listed
Buildings at Trewern Farm, Hengoed (ca. 1875), now Grade II listed
Frongoch Board School (1877)
Parish Church of St Tudclud (date uncertain), now Grade II listed

Publications 
Lloyd Williams and Underwood published some self-authored books in 1872, titled Architectural Monuments of Denbighshire and Village Churches of Denbighshire.

References 

19th-century Welsh architects
People from Denbigh